Kevin Rowson "Kev" Lingard (born 14 August 1942) is an Australian politician. He was a National Party (Liberal National from 2008 onwards) member of the Legislative Assembly of Queensland from 1983 to 2009 and a former Deputy Leader of the Nationals in Queensland.

Political career
Lingard first entered state parliament as the member for Fassifern at the 1983 state election. He held the seat until its abolition at the 1992 state election, upon which he won the replacement seat of Beaudesert. He remained the member for Beaudesert until his retirement at the 2009 state election.

Lingard served as Speaker of the Legislative Assembly of Queensland from February to November 1987. He resigned the Speakership to accept the position of Minister for Health and Environment in the dying days of the Joh Bjelke-Petersen premiership. He held the job for just a week until Mike Ahern became Premier of Queensland on 1 December 1987 and Lingard was not included in the ministry. Lingard again became Speaker in September 1989, retaining the position until November that year, when his party lost the 1989 state election.

Lingard served as Deputy Leader of the National Party from 1992 to 1998. When the National Party returned to government in 1996, Lingard was appointed Minister for Families, Youth and Community Care under the premiership of Rob Borbidge. He retained the portfolio until he was fired by Borbidge in February 1998 for a "clerical error", a $538 dinner claim made by his then senior policy adviser, Wendy Howard, in August 1996. The claim was rejected by the Treasury department - Lingard was one of eight people who attended the dinner.

At the March 2009 state election, Lingard retired as the member for Beaudesert and was replaced as Liberal National Party candidate by Aidan McLindon.

Personal life

Lingard was born in the Queensland town of Miles. He is married with two daughters and one son.

References

 

1942 births
Living people
Members of the Queensland Legislative Assembly
National Party of Australia members of the Parliament of Queensland
Liberal National Party of Queensland politicians
Speakers of the Queensland Legislative Assembly
21st-century Australian politicians